Deewane Tere Pyaar Key (Urdu: دیوانے تیرے پیار کے, English title: Love Crazy) is an Urdu language film which was released on 7 November 1997. 

It was directed by Syed Noor and produced at Evernew Studios.

Plot
This film story is about a girl named Kiran, daughter of a Pakistani man and an Indian woman living in Mauritius. This girl comes to Pakistan to see his grand parents' grave and she loses her passport and the cash money with her. Then she meets a poor boy in Lahore who helps her. They fall in love. The girl returns to Mauritius. Boy Nomi had promised her that he would come to Mauritius after her. Her uncle forced him to not come to Mauritius by influencing the country's embassy in Pakistan. Nomi travels illegally. Kiran's marriage breaks. Nomi gets caught as a terrorist. While he was struggling in Mauritius he met khan lala who becomes his friend.  Meanwhile, khan lala gathers his people in Mauritius in support of nomi to prove him innocent. Court orders to deports nomi. In the plane, he finds out that Kiran and her parents had also boarded the same plane going back to Pakistan.

Cast
 Moammar Rana as Nouman (Nomi)
 Jia Ali as Kiran
 Badar Munir as Khan Lala
 Nadeem as father of Kiran
 Yasmeen Ismail as mother of Kiran 
 Deeba as Nomi's mother
 Sardar Kamal as Nomi's friend 
 Irfan Khoosat as Kiran's uncle
 Raja Callikan as friend of villain

Awards and nominations

References

External links
Deewane Tere Pyar Ke - IMDB.com

1997 films
1990s Urdu-language films
1990s romantic action films
Films scored by Amjad Bobby
Pakistani action films
Pakistani romance films
Films directed by Syed Noor
Nigar Award winners
Urdu-language Pakistani films